is a plant in the lily family native to Japan.

Etymology

In the Japanese horticultural trade, cultivated types are referred to as  while the wild-growing ones are called . Furthermore, plants growing along the Pacific Ocean are called , distinguished from  that grow on the coasts of the Sea of Japan.

Range
Lilium maculatum is native to the central and northern regions of Japan, widely cultivated as an ornamental.

The perennial plan grows on sandy seashores, rocky areas, or cliff-tops.

General description

It is a stem rooting lily, its bulbs are ovate and white, lacking bitterness. Parts of the scales on the bulb may be jointed. Sometimes the yellow lilies exhibit spotlessness

In Japan, plants growing on the Pacific coast bloom from the latter half of June until early August, much later than the 
lilies on the coasts of the Sea of Japan that bloom from the latter half of May to early June.

This species used to be considered one of the more important in food consumption as lily bulb or  around the turn of the 20th century.

Varieties
Recognized cultivars
Lilium maculatum var. bukosanense  (Honda) H.Hara 
Lilium maculatum var. maculatum

The variety bukosanense was originally discovered on Mount Bukō in Saitama Prefecture near Tokyo, with scattered populations later found in Ibaraki Prefecture. The variety is unusual, as it is a "hanging" or "weeping" type with a pendulous stem, but is listed as critically endangered by Saitama's Red Data Book. The mountain has been heavily quarried for limestone by the cement industry, which now collaborates in the plant's conservation efforts in captivity; foraging by wildlife such as the Japanese macaque is also thought to jeopardizes its survival.

Japanese literature c. 1900 writes of several yellow varieties grown which had no spots, but a warning was written against their export, while only spotted or lightly spotted varieties of these yellow lilies were being shipped to the West. Years later, the spotless yellow lilies were still considered few and elusive.

Formerly included
Lilium maculatum subsp. dauricum (Ker Gawl.) H.Hara, now considered a synonym of Lilium pensylvanicum Ker Gawl.
Lilium maculatum var. monticola H.Hara, now considered a synonym of Lilium maculatum var. maculatum

Explanatory notes

References
Citations

Bibliography

 
 Seika-en Sanjin 精花園山人 "Hana-yuri 花百合", in 

maculatum
Flora of Japan
Plants described in 1794